The Caproni Ca.310 Libeccio (Italian: southwest wind) was an Italian monoplane, twin-engine reconnaissance aircraft used in World War II. Derived from the similar Ca.309, it had its combat debut during the Spanish Civil War and took part in the earlier phases of World War II in Libya. Some were used in attack groups as a temporary replacement for the unsatisfactory Breda Ba.65. The last Ca.310 was retired by the Italian Air Force in 1948.

Design and development
The Ca.310 was designed as a low-wing monoplane reconnaissance/bomber, being essentially a version of the semi-military Ca.309 with retractable landing gear and uprated engines. The fuselage was of welded steel tube construction with a covering of light alloy panels and fabric, while the empennage/tail unit was of wooden construction with plywood skin on its fixed portions and fabric covering on control surfaces.

Above the fuselage, mounted in line with the wing trailing edges was a manually operated dorsal turret armed with a single  Breda-SAFAT machine gun.

Operational history

Caproni pinned great hopes on the Ca. 310's effectiveness as a combat aircraft, only to be dashed when its performance fell short of expectations. This lack of performance resulted in both Norway and Hungary being disappointed with the export models they received in 1938. The Ca.310 had been evaluated by the Regia Aeronautica (Italian Air Force) which ordered a small batch. A unit of 16 aircraft was sent to Spain in July 1938 for operational trials as a reconnaissance/bomber by the Italian expeditionary force operating alongside the Nationalist insurgents in the Spanish Civil War.

The Norwegian aircraft were acquired as part of a dried and salted cod (Klippfisk) barter deal between Norway and Italy. The original order, including options, was for 24 aircraft, but after seeing that the aircraft did not perform well, the Norwegian authorities refused to accept any further Ca.310s. Instead, a delivery of 12 Caproni Ca.312s with upgraded engines and improved performance was substituted, but not delivered before the German invasion of Norway on 9 April 1940. A similar scenario occurred with other export contracts, especially with a hoped-for Royal Air Force order for bomber trainers being curtailed during negotiations with Caproni when Italy entered the war as an Axis power.

A series of 12 Ca.310bis were produced for Yugoslavia. This variant differed mainly in having an unstepped, glazed nose. The prototype Ca.310bis served as the development for the Caproni Ca.311.

The 33 Hungarian Ca.310s returned to Italy were refurbished by Caproni and reissued to the 50˚ Stormo d’Assalto. The Ca.310 was not considered an effective combat aircraft and when it saw service during World War II, it was as a reconnaissance aircraft and as a light bomber in areas where no serious opposition was expected.

Peruvian Aeronautical Corps Ca.310s took part in the July 1941 Ecuadorian–Peruvian War. Together with North American NA.50s, the Peruvian Ca.310s flew bombing missions against Ecuadorian cities and supported Army of Peru ground forces.

Variants
Ca.310  Twin-engined reconnaissance aircraft, powered by two Piaggio Stella P.VII C.16/35 seven-cylinder radial piston engines.
Ca.310 Idro Twin-float seaplane version.
Ca.310bisEffectively the prototype of the Caproni Ca.311 with the unstepped all-glazed nose and two Piaggio Stella P.VII C.35 engines
Ca.318Proposed derivative powered by two Gnome-Rhône 14K engines

Operators

Zrakoplovstvo Nezavisne Države Hrvatske operated seven captured ex-Yugoslav aircraft.

Royal Hungarian Air Force ordered 36 examples in 1938, but returned the surviving 33 in 1940 after being unhappy with type's performance.

Regia Aeronautica 193 aircraft
Aviazione Legionaria 16 aircraft
Italian Co-Belligerent Air Force
 Postwar
Aeronautica Militare Italiana

Norwegian Army Air Service operated four Ca.310s. Serial: 501, 503, 505 and 507

Cuerpo de Aviación del Perú purchased 16 aircraft in 1938. 15 of them were delivered by ship in May 1938, and the last one was lost during the ferry flight from Italy to Peru on August 2, 1939, killing Capt. Pedro Canga Rodríguez and one of his crew members - their deaths being immortalized in the song "Alas Peruanas" by Los Morochucos.

Aviación Nacional -16 aircraft

Royal Yugoslav Air Force purchased 12 aircraft in 1938.

SFR Yugoslav Air Force - Postwar.

Surviving aircraft
One Norwegian example is being restored and is displayed at Sola Aviation Museum.

Specifications (Ca.310)

See also

References

Bibliography

Further reading
 
 Donald, David Ed. The Complete Encyclopedia of World Aircraft. 2001. Amber Books, London. .

External links

 Comando Supremo on the CA.310
 Constable.ca on the Ca.310
 World War 2 Aircraft: Caproni Bergamaschi CA 310 Series

Ca.310
1930s Italian military reconnaissance aircraft
Low-wing aircraft
Twin piston-engined tractor aircraft
Aircraft first flown in 1937